The following is a list of notable women journalists who were born in Afghanistan:

 Shakaiba Sanga Amaj (Pashto:شکېبا څانګه آماج) (born 1986 assassinated 2007) 
 Asma Rasmya (born 1877) editor, school principled and feminist. Mother of queen Soraya Tarzi and the mother-in-law of king Amanullah Khan
 Najiba Ayubi journalist, humanitarian and activist. Managing director of the Killid Group nonprofit media network.
 Basira Joya (born 2001 or 2002) anchor for Zan TV and Ariana Television Network before fleeing to the U.S. in 2021.
 Zohra Daoud (Dari: زهره يوسف داود); (born 1954 in Kabul) Miss Afghanistan 1972 winner, fled Afghanistan for the United States.
 Maryam Durani (مَریَم دورانی) (born 1987) Afghan activist and women's advocate. 2012 winner of the International Women of Courage Award.
 Farahnaz Forotan (born 1992) journalist and women's rights activist.
 Saeeda Mahmood BBC World Service journalist
 Mina Mangal (1992 to 2019) journalist, political advisor, and women's rights activist who was killed by gunfire in 2019 in uncertain circumstances.
 Horia Mosadiq human rights activist, political analyst and journalist who works for Amnesty International.

 Fariba Nawa (born 1973) freelance journalist and author of Opium Nation.
 Farida Nekzad co-founder of Pajhwok Afghan News, former vice president of the South Asia Free Media Association
 Fatima Rahimi (born 1992) Afghan-Czech journalistm presenter of Hergot! on Czech Radio's Radio Wave.

 Zakia Zaki (c. 1972 – 4 June 2007) journalist and founder of Afghan Radio Peace (Sada-i-Sulh) station.

See also 

 List of Afghan women writers

References 

Lists of journalists
Lists of Afghan women
Lists of Afghan people by occupation
Afghan women journalists